A multivariate polynomial is SOS-convex (or sum of squares convex) if its Hessian matrix H can be factored as H(x) = ST(x)S(x) where S is a matrix  (possibly rectangular) which entries are polynomials in x. In other words, the Hessian matrix is a SOS matrix polynomial.

An equivalent definition is that the form defined as g(x,y) = yTH(x)y is a sum of squares of forms.

Connection with convexity 
If a polynomial is SOS-convex, then it is also convex. Since establishing whether a polynomial is SOS-convex amounts to solving a semidefinite programming problem, SOS-convexity can be used as a proxy to establishing if a polynomial is convex. In contrast, deciding if a generic polynomial of degree large than four is convex is a NP-hard problem.

The first counterexample of a polynomial which is convex but not SOS-convex was constructed by Amir Ali Ahmadi and Pablo Parrilo in 2009.  The polynomial is a homogeneous polynomial that is sum-of-squares and given by:In the same year, Grigoriy Blekherman proved in a non-constructive manner that there exist convex forms that is not representable as sum of squares. An explicit example of a convex form (with degree 4 and 272 variables) that is not a sum of squares was claimed by James Saunderson in 2021.

Connection with non-negativity and sum-of-squares 
In 2013 Amir Ali Ahmadi and Pablo Parrilo showed that every convex homogeneous polynomial in n variables and degree 2d is SOS-convex if and only if either (a) n = 2 or (b) 2d = 2 or (c) n = 3 and 2d = 4. Impressively, the same relation is valid for non-negative homogeneous polynomial in n variables and degree 2d that can be represented as sum of squares polynomials (See Hilbert's seventeenth problem).

References

See also 

 Hilbert's seventeenth problem
 Polynomial SOS
 Sum-of-squares optimization

Homogeneous polynomials
Real algebraic geometry
Convex analysis